Jarrad Hoeata (born 12 December 1983) is a professional rugby union player who plays for New Zealand side Taranaki. He made his debut for the All Blacks during the 2011 Tri Nations tournament.

Early life
Hoeata was born on 12 December 1983 in Tauranga where he grew up in Papamoa in the Bay of Plenty but moved to Christchurch to study for a teaching career. He comes from a family of four brothers and a sister.

Hoeata's sporting talents centred on volleyball in which he played for the New Zealand secondary schools team in regular series against Australia. But in his latter years at school he showed some rugby talent and was selected in the Tauranga Boys' College first XV and then the Bay of Plenty secondary schools side.

After his schooldays in Tauranga, Hoeata headed for Christchurch to try his hand at Teachers College, while also having a crack at advancing his rugby. After a season of club rugby, playing alongside the likes of Andrew Mehrtens and Reuben Thorne on occasions, Canterbury officials saw his talent and was whisked into the union's academy setup and went on to play for Canterbury and the Crusaders development team.

Domestic career

Hoeata largely played for Canterbury B but made one appearance for Canterbury – "in Andrew Mehrtens' last game" – a Ranfurly Shield defence against Marlborough in 2005. He came off the bench but hasn't been remembered if it was to replace Thorne on the blindside flank or one of the starting locks. The 2006 season proved to be a turning point for Hoeata, then aged 23. He made the move to Taranaki. It became clear Hoeata would have to leave Canterbury just because there were so many All Blacks there.

He added another 13 caps in 2007 from a one-match suspension. After making a dangerous charge on North Harbour fullback George Pisi. After losing much of 2008 to a serious knee injury Hoeata established himself as a regular starter for Taranaki in the 2009 Air New Zealand Cup after making 12 starts to earn himself a Super Rugby contract.

Hoeata earned a spot with the Chiefs for the 2010 Super 14 season, and spent the season as a depth player on the squad, making 5 appearances but not starting a match. But got his chance to make his Super Rugby debut off the bench against the Bulls. Hoeata's 2010 season with Taranaki started on a sour note with a drunk-driving arrest but he rebounded with his strongest season for Taranaki in the 2010 ITM Cup, scoring two tries as the province was one of the surprises of the competition.

When Jamie Joseph, who had previously coached Hoeata with the New Zealand Māori, offered Hoeata a chance to move south to join the Highlanders for the 2011 Super Rugby season, Hoeata jumped at the chance. While he played mainly at flanker with Taranaki, Joseph chose to use him as a lock and he developed into one of the form players of the competition, with his strong play keeping All Black Tom Donnelly on the substitute's bench.

In January 2018, Hoeata joined French Top 14 side Montpellier Hérault Rugby as a medical joker replacement for the injured Jacques du Plessis.

International career

After a strong season with Taranaki, Hoeata was selected to the New Zealand Māori for their 2010 Centenary Series. Used as a lock by coach Jamie Joseph, he started all three games in the series and was one of the standouts in victories over Ireland and England.

Hoeata's strong performances with the Highlanders saw him garner attention as a potential future All Black, and he was selected to the national squad for the 2011 Tri Nations Series. He made his All Blacks debut on 22 July 2011 against Fiji in a 60–14 victory. However he narrowly missed selection to the victorious New Zealand squad for the 2011 Rugby World Cup.

References

External links 

 itsrugby.co.uk profile

1983 births
Living people
New Zealand rugby union players
New Zealand international rugby union players
Māori All Blacks players
Canterbury rugby union players
Taranaki rugby union players
Chiefs (rugby union) players
Highlanders (rugby union) players
Rugby union players from Tauranga
Rugby union locks
Rugby union flankers
Male rugby sevens players
New Zealand expatriate rugby union players
Expatriate rugby union players in Wales
New Zealand expatriate sportspeople in Wales
Cardiff Rugby players